Electricity Regulatory Authority House, also New ERA House, is a commercial office building constructed between June 2018 and September 2021, in Kampala, the  capital of Uganda, and the largest city in that country. The building serves as the headquarters of Electricity Regulatory Authority, (ERA), the Uganda government agency responsible for the regulation, licensing, and supervision of  the generation, transmission, distribution, sale, export, and importation of electricity in that country.

Location
The skyscraper is located at 5C1 Third Street, in the Industrial Area of Kampala, Uganda's capital.

Overview
Under construction since June 2018, the office complex consists of a six storied office tower, underground parking, perimeter fencing, courtyard, gate houses and gates as well as paved ground-level parking.

New ERA House is a "smart, green building", with  elevator surveillance, monitored energy usage and natural air conditioning. The office building can accommodate 120 workers, and includes a kitchen, gymnasium and breastfeeding parlor. Other intelligent and conservation features include electronic entry and exit doors, bicycle parking racks and two stand-by solar systems. The building also has a cafeteria and a 133-seater conference theater.

Construction
The budgeted cost of construction was USh34.4 billion (approx. US$9.8 million), according to Ziria Tibalwa Waako, the Chief Executive Officer of ERA, as quoted by the Daily Monitor. However, actual construction expenditure was USh26.7 billion (approx. US$7.6 million), with savings of USh7.6 billion (approx. US$2.2 million).

ROKO Construction Company, a Ugandan engineering and construction firm, was awarded the engineering, procurement and construction contract. Archtech Consults (Uganda) Limited, a Ugandan consulting engineering company was appointed as Owner's Engineer. The government of Uganda funded the construction of the building.

See also
 List of tallest buildings in Kampala
 Kampala Central Division
 URA House
 Energy in Uganda

References

External links
 Approximate Location of Electricity Regulatory Authority House, Industrial Area, Kampala, Uganda
 Website of Uganda Electricity Regulatory Authority
 Ziria Waako: CEO with a vision for women As of 14 June 2020.

Buildings and structures in Uganda
Buildings and structures in Kampala
Kampala Central Division
2021 establishments in Uganda
Office buildings completed in 2021